In graph theory, a branch of mathematics, the Hajós construction is an operation on graphs named after  that may be used to construct any critical graph or any graph whose chromatic number is at least some given threshold.

The construction

For example, let  and  each be a complete graph  on four vertices; because of the symmetry of these graphs, the choice of which edge to select from each of them is unimportant. In this case, the result of applying the Hajós construction is the Moser spindle, a seven-vertex unit distance graph that requires four colors.

Constructible graphs
A graph  is said to be -constructible (or Hajós--constructible) when it formed in one of the following three ways:
The complete graph  is -constructible.
Let  and  be any two -constructible graphs.
Then the graph formed by combining  and  into a single vertex is also -constructible. Equivalently, this graph may be formed by adding edge  to the graph and then contracting it.

Connection to coloring
It is straightforward to verify that every -constructible graph requires at least  colors in any proper graph coloring. Indeed, this is clear for the complete graph , and the effect of identifying two nonadjacent vertices is to force them to have the same color as each other in any coloring, something that does not reduce the number of colors.

Hajós proved more strongly that a graph requires at least  colors, in any proper coloring, if and only if it contains a -constructible graph as a subgraph. Equivalently, every -critical graph (a graph that requires  colors but for which every proper subgraph requires fewer colors) is -constructible. Alternatively, every graph that requires  colors may be formed by combining the Hajós construction, the operation of identifying any two nonadjacent vertices, and the operations of adding a vertex or edge to the given graph, starting from the complete graph .

A similar construction may be used for list coloring in place of coloring.

Constructibility of critical graphs
For , every -critical graph (that is, every odd cycle) can be generated as a -constructible graph such that all of the graphs formed in its construction are also -critical. Subsequently, -critical but not -constructible graphs solely through -critical graphs were found for all . For , one such example is the graph obtained from the dodecahedron graph by adding a new edge between each pair of antipodal vertices

The Hajós number

They showed that, for an -vertex graph  with  edges, . If every graph has a polynomial Hajós number, this would imply that it is possible to prove non-colorability in nondeterministic polynomial time, and therefore imply that NP = co-NP, a conclusion considered unlikely by complexity theorists. However, it is not known how to prove non-polynomial lower bounds on the Hajós number without making some complexity-theoretic assumption, and if such a bound could be proven it would also imply the existence of non-polynomial bounds on certain types of Frege system in mathematical logic.

There exist 3-chromatic graphs for which the smallest such expression tree has exponential size.

Other applications
 used the Hajós construction to generate an infinite set of 4-critical polyhedral graphs, each having more than twice as many edges as vertices. Similarly,  used the construction, starting with the Grötzsch graph, to generate many 4-critical triangle-free graphs, which they showed to be difficult to color using traditional backtracking algorithms.

In polyhedral combinatorics,  used the Hajós construction to generate facets of the stable set polytope.

Notes

References
.
.
.
.
.
.
.
.
.
.
.
.
.

Graph operations
Graph coloring